The 1930 Centre Colonels football team represented Centre College as a member the Southern Intercollegiate Athletic Association (SIAA) during the 1930 college football season. Led by third-year head coach Ed Kubale, the Colonels compiled an overall record of 7–3, with a mark of 5–0 in conference play.

Schedule

References

Centre
Centre Colonels football seasons
Centre Colonels football